The 1986 Australian Formula 2 Championship was a CAMS sanctioned Australian national motor racing title open to Australian Formula 2 cars. The title, which was the 19th Australian Formula 2 Championship, was won by Jonathan Crooke, driving a Cheetah Mk.8 Volkswagen.

Calendar

The 1986 Australian Formula 2 Championship was contested over a nine round series.

Points system
Points were awarded to the first 20 placegetters in each race as per the following table:

 Where a round was contested over two races, each driver's points were aggregated and then divided by the two to determine the championship points allocation for that round.
 Only the best eight round results counted towards a driver's total.

Championship results

Note:
 The above table lists only the top ten championship positions.
 Only the best eight round results counted towards a driver's total. Discarded points are shown within brackets.

References

External links
 1986 Australian open wheeler racing images at www.autopics.com.au

Australian Formula 2 Championship
Formula 2 Championship